Aleksandrs Cauņa (born 19 January 1988) is a Latvian former professional footballer who played as a midfielder.

Career

Club
Born in Daugavpils, at youth level Cauņa played for Dinaburg, being brought to Skonto Riga system at the age of 14 in 2002, where he spent three years. In 2006, he joined the Latvian First League side Olimps Riga, playing 10 matches and scoring 2 goals. In 2006, he re-joined Skonto Riga and got a place in the starting eleven. He was named the best youth player in Latvia despite playing only half the season in 2006.

In January 2008 Cauņa was invited to join the Premier League club Chelsea on trial and he trained with the club's reserves. After the 2008 season Cauņa was on trials at several Premier League clubs, including Blackburn Rovers and Sunderland, but moves eventually fell through as managers Paul Ince and Roy Keane left the clubs.

On 2 February 2009, he joined English Championship club Watford on loan until the end of the 2008–09 season, with a view to a permanent move. On 3 March he made his debut, coming on as a 74th-minute substitute for Jon Harley in the 2–1 defeat to Plymouth Argyle at Home Park. Cauņa scored his first Watford goal on his full debut for the club, firing a powerful half-volley in a 2–2 draw with Southampton at Vicarage Road on 7 April 2009. He returned to Skonto at the end of the season.

On 25 August 2010, he went on trial with English Premier League side Blackpool, playing in their Lancashire Senior Cup tie against Morecambe later the same day at Bloomfield Road, but did not stay with the club.

CSKA Moscow
At the start of 2011 Cauņa went on trial with the Russian Premier League side PFC CSKA Moscow, and on 1 February 2011 he was loaned to the club for four months. He made his debut on 17 February in the UEFA Europa League match against PAOK.

On 27 June 2011, CSKA bought out his rights from Skonto and he signed a five-year contract with CSKA. On 18 October 2011, Cauņa scored his first goal in the UEFA Champions League group stages in a 3–0 victory over Trabzonspor.

Cauņa scored his first Russian Premier League goal for CSKA on 19 August 2012 in a match against Mordovia Saransk. On 26 August 2012, Cauņa scored his second RPL goal against Krylia Sovetov Samara – a powerful blast from 30 metres, that was later highly rated and put him in the team of the week. On 26 September Cauņa and CSKA matched up against FC Tom Tomsk at the 1/16 stage of Russian Cup. CSKA came out with 1–0 win, with Cauņa being a goalscorer. He made an undeniable shot with left foot from outside the penalty area.

Cauņa left CSKA Moscow by mutual consent on 11 January 2017.

FK Jelgava
On 28 December 2018, it was announced, that Cauna had signed with FK Jelgava as a coach, but he also wanted to return on the pitch some time.

International career
Cauņa was a vital member of the Latvia national team since his international debut in 2007. He scored his first two international goals in 2009 – in the 2010 FIFA World Cup qualification matches against Luxembourg (a 4–0 win) and Switzerland (a 2–2 draw). His third goal came on 11 August 2010 in a 4–1 friendly match defeat to Czech Republic. It was his first appearance after recovering from a serious injury and being out of football for almost six months. On 12 October he scored a last-minute bicycle kick to level against Georgia in a UEFA Euro 2012 qualifying match. In 2008, he helped the team win the Baltic Cup. As of 3 November 2013 he had made 40 appearances for Latvia, scoring 11 goals.

Career statistics

Club

International

Scores and results list Latvia's goal tally first, score column indicates score after each Cauņa goal.

Non-FIFA International goals

Honours
Skonto Riga
Virsliga: 2010

CSKA Moscow
Russian Premier League: 2012–13, 2013–14, 2015–16
Russian Cup: 2011, 2013
Russian Super Cup: 2013

Latvia
Baltic Cup: 2008, 2012

Individual
Latvian Higher League young footballer of the season: 2006
Latvian Young Footballer of the Year: 2006, 2007, 2008
Latvian Footballer of the Year: 2011, 2012

References

External links
 Aleksandrs Cauna player profile at CSKA Moscow official website
 Aleksandrs Cauna player profile at skontofc.lv
 Aleksandrs Cauna player profile at watfordfc.com
 
 
 
 Aleksandrs Cauņa player profile at lff.lv

Living people
1988 births
Sportspeople from Daugavpils
Latvian footballers
Association football midfielders
Latvia international footballers
Latvian Higher League players
English Football League players
Russian Premier League players
Skonto FC players
Watford F.C. players
PFC CSKA Moscow players
JFK Olimps players
FK RFS players
Latvian expatriate footballers
Latvian expatriate sportspeople in England
Latvian expatriate sportspeople in Russia
Expatriate footballers in England
Expatriate footballers in Russia